Big Brother (French TV series) may refer to:

Loft Story (French TV series), the first French adaptation of the Big Brother format in France.
Secret Story (French TV series), the second French adaptation of the Big Brother format in France.